West of Paperino (Italian: Ad ovest di Paperino) is a 1981 Italian comedy film directed by Alessandro Benvenuti.

It is the first film of the comedy trio "I GianCattivi", formed by Athina Cenci, Francesco Nuti and Benvenuti, who won the Nastro d'Argento for Best New Director. The film is set in Florence, Tuscany, with some scenes shot in Prato. The title is an inside joke that refers to the Tuscan village of Paperino, which is a district of Prato; the film's surreal and grotesque undertones are also hinted by the title itself, since "Paperino" is also the Italian name for Donald Duck.

Cast
Athina Cenci as Marta
Alessandro Benvenuti as Sandro
Francesco Nuti as Francesco Sabatini
Paolo Hendel as Veleno
Gianna Sammarco as Francesco's mother
Novello Novelli as Francesco's father
Renato Scarpa as Don Vincenzo
Franco Javarone as Notturno
Silvano Panichi as Wiliams
Lucilla Baroni as Lucilla
Franco Piacentini as Torchio
Giovanni Nannini as Belvedere
Paolo Pieri as Mario the barman
Angelo Pellegrino as the employee of the employment office
Giorgio Picchianti as the fisherman

References

External links

1981 films
1980s Italian-language films
1981 comedy films
Italian comedy films
Films directed by Alessandro Benvenuti
Films set in Florence
Films set in Tuscany
Films shot in Tuscany
1980s Italian films